Eukaryotic translation initiation factor 3 subunit F (eIF3f) is a protein that in humans is encoded by the EIF3F gene.

Interactions 

EIF3F has been shown to interact with Mammalian target of rapamycin and EIF3A.

See also 
Eukaryotic initiation factor 3 (eIF3)

References

Further reading